Earl Cowley is a title in the Peerage of the United Kingdom. It was created in 1857 for the diplomat Henry Wellesley, 2nd Baron Cowley. He was Ambassador to France from 1852 to 1867. He was made Viscount Dangan, of Dangan in the County of Meath, at the same time as he was given the earldom. This title is also in the Peerage of the United Kingdom. Lord Cowley was the eldest son of Henry Wellesley, 1st Baron Cowley, who like his son served as Ambassador to France. In 1828 he was created Baron Cowley, of Wellesley in the County of Somerset, in the Peerage of the United Kingdom. A member of the prominent Wellesley family, Cowley was the fifth and youngest son of Garret Wellesley, 1st Earl of Mornington, and the younger brother of Arthur Wellesley, 1st Duke of Wellington, and Richard Wellesley, 1st Marquess Wellesley.

The first Earl was succeeded by his eldest son, the second Earl. He was a Lieutenant-Colonel in the Coldstream Guards and fought in the Crimean War. His great-great-grandson (the titles having descended from father to son), the sixth Earl, served as a Lord-in-waiting (government whip in the House of Lords) from January to March 1974 in the Conservative government of Edward Heath. He was succeeded in 1975 by his uncle, the seventh Earl, who was the eldest son from the second marriage of the fourth Earl and the half-brother of the fifth Earl.  the titles are held by the latter's son, the eighth Earl, who succeeded in 2016. As a male-line descendant of the first Earl of Mornington, he is also in remainder to this peerage and its subsidiary titles, which are now held by his kinsman the Duke of Wellington.

Barons Cowley (1828)
Henry Wellesley, 1st Baron Cowley (1773–1847)
Henry Richard Charles Wellesley, 2nd Baron Cowley (1804–1884) (created Earl Cowley in 1857)

Earls Cowley (1857)
Henry Richard Charles Wellesley, 1st Earl Cowley (1804–1884)
William Henry Wellesley, 2nd Earl Cowley (1834–1895)
Henry Arthur Mornington Wellesley, 3rd Earl Cowley (1866–1919)
Christian Arthur Wellesley, 4th Earl Cowley (1890–1962)
Denis Arthur Wellesley, 5th Earl Cowley (1921–1968)
Richard Francis Wellesley, 6th Earl Cowley (1946–1975)
Garret Graham Wellesley, 7th Earl Cowley (1934–2016)
Garret Graham Wellesley, 8th Earl Cowley (b. 1965)

The heir apparent is the present holder's son Henry Arthur Peter Wellesley, Viscount Dangan (b. 1991).

Line of succession

 Henry Wellesley, 1st Baron Cowley (1773–1847)
 Henry Wellesley, 1st Earl Cowley (1804–1884)
 William Wellesley, 2nd Earl Cowley (1834–1895)
 Henry Wellesley, 3rd Earl Cowley (1866–1919)
 Christian Wellesley, 4th Earl Cowley (1890–1962)
 Denis Wellesley, 5th Earl Cowley (1921–1968)
 Richard Wellesley, 6th Earl Cowley (1946-1975)
 Garret Wellesley, 7th Earl Cowley (1934–2016)
 Graham Wellesley, 8th Earl Cowley (b. 1965)
(1) Henry Wellesley, Viscount Dangan (b. 1991)
(2) The Hon. Bertram Wellesley (b. 1999)
(3) The Hon. Brian Wellesley (b. 1938)
The Hon. Henry Wellesley (1907–1981)
(4) Henry Wellesley (b. 1970)
(5) Richard Wellesley (b. 1972)The Hon. William Wellesley (1806–1875)Gerald Wellesley (1846–1915)Gerald Wellesley (1885–1961)Julian Wellesley (1933–1996)(6) William Wellesley (b. 1966)
(7) Julian Wellesley (b. 1997)
(8) George Wellesley (b. 2007)The Hon. Gerald Valerian Wellesley (1809–1882)Albert Wellesley (?–?)

References

Attribution

 Kidd, Charles, Williamson, David (editors). Debrett's Peerage and Baronetage (1990 edition). New York: St Martin's Press, 1990,

External links

Earldoms in the Peerage of the United Kingdom
Noble titles created in 1857